The Best Of Gil Scott-Heron is a 1984 compilation album by American recording artist Gil Scott-Heron, released on the Arista label.

Track listing
All songs written by Gil Scott-Heron.

Side One

"The Revolution Will Not Be Televised" (1974)
"The Bottle" (1976)
"Winter in America" (1975)
"Johannesburg" (1975)
"Ain't No Such Thing as Superman" (1974)

Side Two

"Re-Ron" (1984)
"Shut 'Em Down" (1979)
"Angel Dust" (1978)
"B Movie" (1981)

External links
 Gil Scott-Heron Site

Gil Scott-Heron albums
1984 greatest hits albums
Arista Records compilation albums